José Eugênio Soares (16 January 1938 – 5 August 2022), known professionally as Jô Soares (Portuguese: /ˈʒo soˈaɾis, ˈswa-, -ɾiʃ/), or Jô, was a Brazilian comedian, talk show host, author, musician, actor and writer.

Early life 
Soares was born in Rio de Janeiro. Initially pursuing diplomatic service, influenced by his great-grandfather, Soares returned to Brazil for acting classes, and started his career in Rio de Janeiro in 1958.

Career 
Soares' television career began at TV Rio in 1958, writing and performing in comedy shows for the station. In 1970, he began to work at Rede Globo. Soares moved to SBT, in 1988, as the host of, “Jô Soares Onze e Meia”, (Jô Soares at Eleven-Thirty), which aired until 1999. In 2000, he took his show's format (very similar to David Letterman's) back to Rede Globo, where it was then named, “Programa do Jô”, which ran until 2016.

His first novel, O Xangô de Baker Street (translated as A Samba for Sherlock), was published in 1995 and has been translated into several languages. In 2001 it was made into the film O Xangô de Baker Street. Soares also put out various jazz CDs, as well as producing many plays, including a recent version of Richard III.

Personal life
Jô Soares was a Roman Catholic. He expressed devotion to Rita of Cascia.

Filmography 
Below is an incomplete filmography:

Bibliography 

 A Samba for Sherlock (book) ( (1995)
Twelve Fingers (1998)
Assassinatos na Academia Brasileira de Letras (2005)
As Esganadas (2011)

References

External links
 
 

1938 births
2022 deaths
People from Rio de Janeiro (city)
Brazilian male comedians
Brazilian television presenters
Brazilian trumpeters
Musicians from Rio de Janeiro (city)
Translators to Portuguese
21st-century trumpeters
Brazilian Roman Catholics
21st-century Roman Catholics
20th-century Roman Catholics
21st-century translators